Samsung Galaxy was a professional esports works team of the South Korean corporation Samsung Electronics. During its existence it had teams competing in League of Legends, StarCraft and StarCraft II.

Samsung's League of Legends division was created on September 7, 2013, after MVP's two teams, MVP Blue and MVP White, were acquired by Samsung. Samsung White won the 2014 World Championship, while Samsung Blue finished at semifinals. The two teams later merged due to "one organization - one pro team" rules by Riot Games, and Samsung Galaxy went on to finish as the runners-up of the 2016 World Championship and the champions of the 2017 World Championship. Samsung Galaxy's rosters and LCK spot later was acquired by KSV Esports, now Gen.G.

Tournament results

StarCraft 
 2008 — Shinhan Bank StarCraft Pro League Champions

League of Legends 
 Ongamenet League of Legends Champions Spring 2014 — 1st
 2014 League of Legends World Championship — 1st (Samsung White), 3rd (Samsung Blue)
 2016 League of Legends World Championship — 2nd 
 2017 League of Legends World Championship —  1st

References 

2000 establishments in South Korea
Esports teams based in South Korea
Samsung Electronics
Samsung Sports
Esports teams established in 2000
Esports teams disestablished in 2017
StarCraft teams
Former League of Legends Champions Korea teams